Bjoa Church is a parish church of the Church of Norway in Vindafjord Municipality in Rogaland county, Norway. It is located in the village of Bjoa. It is one of the two churches for the Ølen og Bjoa parish which is part of the Haugaland prosti (deanery) in the Diocese of Stavanger. The white, wooden church was built in a long church design and in a neo-gothic style in 1895 using designs by the architect Hartvig Sverdrup Eckhoff. The church seats about 250 people.

History
The earliest existing historical records of the church date back to the 1300s. The location of the medieval church is somewhat unclear. According to local traditions as well as recent studies, there are several possible locations for the church at Bjoa:
According to legend, there was a monastery or church located at that site. 
A local man born 1890 was the source of this information.
Some historical records refer to the church at Bjoa and it makes it seem like the church was located on the same site as the present church.

Regardless of where the church was located, in 1895, a new church was constructed on the present site and the old church was torn down.

See also
List of churches in Rogaland

References

Vindafjord
Churches in Rogaland
Wooden churches in Norway
19th-century Church of Norway church buildings
Churches completed in 1895
1895 establishments in Norway